HD 6 is a star in the equatorial constellation of Pisces, and is located a couple of degrees southeast of the intersection between the ecliptic and the celestial equator. It is a yellow-hued star that is just barely visible to the naked eye with an apparent visual magnitude of 6.3. It has an absolute magnitude of 0.62.

An evolved red giant with a stellar classification K0 III, the star has moved off the main sequence by cooling and expanding. At the age of 1.6 billion years, is now a red clump giant on the horizontal branch that is engaged in core helium fusion. It has nearly double the mass of the Sun and has expanded to 12.4 times the Sun's radius. The star is radiating 72 times the luminosity of the Sun from its photosphere at an effective temperature of 4,807 K.

References

External links
 

Horizontal-branch stars
Pisces (constellation)
BD-01 04525
000006
000417
0002
K-type giants
Piscium, 62